The Yanbaru whiskered bat (Myotis yanbarensis) is a species of vesper bat in the genus Myotis.

It is known only from three islands of the Ryukyu Archipelago, south of Japan, Okinawa (where the Yanbaru forest is situated), Amami Ōshima, and Tokunoshima.
The species has been classified as Critically Endangered by the IUCN.

Etymology and taxonomy
When described, it was placed into the subgenus Selysius, although some have argued that it is not a valid subgenus.
It is closely related to the frosted myotis, which is found on mainland Japan.
Its species name, yanbarensis, is a reference to Yanbaru, the forested part of northern Okinawa Island where this species is found.

Description
Its dorsal hair, ears, and flight membranes are black.
Its guard hairs are metallic silver at the tips.
Its fur is overall soft and silky.
Its snouts are long and horizontal.
The uropatagium attaches to the first toe.
The braincase is small relative to its skull.

Range and habitat
It is only found in the fragments of mature forest remaining on Okinawa Island, Tokunoshima, and Amami Ōshima.
On Okinawa Island, it is found on United States military property.
On Amami Ōshima, its habitat occurs within Amami Guntō Quasi-National Park.
During the day, it roosts in hollow trees.

Conservation
This species was evaluated for the first time by the IUCN in 2000, when it was described as data deficient. It was listed as critically endangered in 2008, which was maintained in the 2019 evaluation.
Deforestation is a major threat to its continued existence.

See also
 Yanbaru

References

Mouse-eared bats
Bats of Asia
Endemic fauna of the Ryukyu Islands
Bat, Yanbaru whiskered
Critically endangered fauna of Asia
Mammals described in 1998
Taxonomy articles created by Polbot